Getting Along Famously is a Canadian sitcom which aired on CBC Television in 2006.

Set in the early 1960s, Getting Along Famously starred real-life couple Colin Mochrie and Debra McGrath as the hosts of a television variety show. Supporting cast members included Robin Duke, Bob Martin, Paul O'Sullivan, Ed Sahely and Patrick McKenna.

The pilot episode, Saving Ruby's Ass, aired January 10, 2005. It was one of three sitcom pilots aired by the CBC, along with Walter Ego and Hatching, Matching and Dispatching, as a viewer response poll. Pilots that polled favourably were developed into full series. The CBC previously employed this strategy with the shows Rideau Hall and An American in Canada.

The series was cancelled in June 2006 and released on DVD in October 2006.

Episodes

2006 Canadian television series debuts
2006 Canadian television series endings
2000s Canadian sitcoms
CBC Television original programming
Television series about television